The 2022 season is Blaublitz Akita' s second season in the J2 League,. The annual club slogan is "超秋田一体".

Squad
As of  2022.

Type 2
Type 2

J2 League

Emperor's Cup

Other games

Gallery

References

External links
 J.League official site

Blaublitz Akita
Blaublitz Akita seasons